Conditioning may refer to:

Science, computing, and technology
 Air conditioning, the removal of heat from indoor air for thermal comfort
 Automobile air conditioning, air conditioning in a vehicle
 Ice storage air conditioning, air conditioning using ice storage
 Solar air conditioning, air conditioning using solar power
 Beer conditioning, maturation, clarification, and stabilisation of beer
 Bottle conditioning, above conditioning after bottling 
 Chemical conditioning, improvement and stabilization chemical components
 Data conditioning, the use of data management techniques in a computer system
 Flow conditioning, the study of the movement of fluids in pipes
 Signal conditioning, manipulating an analog signal in such a way that it meets the requirements of the next stage

Biology and physical fitness
 Aerobic conditioning, exercise which trains the heart and lungs to pump blood more efficiently
Body conditioning via physical exercise

Learning
 Classical conditioning or Pavlovian conditioning, a behavioral mechanism in which one stimulus comes to signal the occurrence of a second stimulus
 Eyeblink conditioning, classical conditioning involving pairing of a stimulus with an eyeblink-eliciting stimulus 
 Fear conditioning, classical conditioning involving aversive stimuli 
 Second-order conditioning, a two-step process in classical conditioning
 Covert conditioning, classical and operant conditioning in mental health treatment 
 Operant conditioning or instrumental conditioning, a form of learning in which behavior is modified by its consequences
 Social conditioning, operant conditioning training individuals to act in a society
 Evaluative conditioning, a form of learning in which attitude towards one stimulus is learnt by its pairing with a second stimulus

Mathematics
 Condition number also known as Conditioning (numerical analysis), a quantity describing whether or not a numerical problem is well-behaved
 Conditioning (probability), a concept in probability theory

See also
 Conditioning regimens in transplantation